The House of Ostrogski (- Ostroz'ki) was one of the more prominent families in the Kingdom of Poland, the Grand Duchy of Lithuania and in the Polish–Lithuanian Commonwealth. The family spanned from the 14th century Ruthenian noble Daniil Ostrogski to the 17th century Polish members. After the death of Janusz Ostrogski, the last male heir, most of the family's possessions passed to the Zasławski family.

History

The Ostrogski family was most likely of Rurikid stock and descended from Sviatopolk II of Kiev. Some scholars however claim that their descent is from the Galicia-Volhynia line of the Rurikid dynasty. Vasilko Romanovich (c.1256-1282), Prince of Slonim, may have been the grandfather of Prince Daniel Ostrogski. The probable progenitor of this family was Prince Danylo Dmytrovych (or Danylo Wasilijewicz), who received Ostroh from Liubartas, King of Galicia-Volhynia and son of Grand Duke of Lithuania Gediminas. His son, Prince Feodor Danilovich Ostrogski, was a supporter of King Jagiello, who in 1386 confirmed him in possession of the Ostroh Castle and appointed governor of Volhynia in 1387. In addition to Ostrog Feodor Danilovich Ostrogski became owner of Korets, Zaslav (Izyaslav, in present Khmelnytskyi Oblast, Ukraine), and other towns. In some chronicles Feodor is called Dux Fethko de Ostrog.
Their dominions in Volynia, Galicia, and Podolia included 24 towns, 10 townlets, and more than 100 villages. 

The most notable among Feodor's descendants was Grand Hetman of Lithuania, Prince Konstanty Ostrogski, who defeated Muscovy in the Battle of Orsha (1514) and his son Konstanty Wasyl Ostrogski (or Konstantin Konstantinovich Ostrozhski). 
Unlike other Ruthenian magnates, the Ostrogskis refused to give up Eastern Orthodoxy for Roman Catholicism despite the cultural pressure that led to Polonization of Ruthenian nobility. For several generations the Ostrogskis supported the religion of their forefathers, by opening schools, printing books in Ruthenian language with Cyrillic such as "Ostrog Bible" (written by Ivan Fedorov) and making a generous charitable contributions to the construction of the Orthodox churches in the region.

The last male member of the family was Janusz Ostrogski (d. 1620); the last female was Anna Alojza Ostrogska (1600–54), married to Grand Hetman Jan Karol Chodkiewicz. When a junior line of the family (princes Zasławski or Zasławski-Ostrogowski) which inherited the Ostrogoski fortune became extinct in 1682 (with the death of Aleksander Janusz Zasławski), their huge possessions passed to the Lubomirski family (due to their marriage with Aleksander sister, Teofilia Ludwika Zasławska) and other families of Polish szlachta. A complicated litigation concerning the Ostrogski inheritance continued until the Russian Empire annexed Poland during the Partitions.

Notable family members 
 Daniil Ostrogski (? - after 1366), ancestor of the Ostrogski house.
 Feodor Ostrogski (1360–1446), governor of Volhynia.
 Konstanty Ostrogski (1460–1530) - Hetman of the Polish–Lithuanian Commonwealth.
 Ilia Ostrogski (1510–1539), Braclaw starost
 Elizaveta Ostrogska (1539–1582)
 Konstanty Wasyl Ostrogski (1526–1608), marshal of Volhynia and voivode of the Kiev Voivodeship.
 Janusz Ostrogski (1554–1620), Voivode of Volhynian Voivodship and castellan of Kraków.
 Aleksander Ostrogski (1571–1603), Voivode of the Volhynian Voivodship.
 Aleksander Janusz Zasławski-Ostrogski (c.1650 - 1682), Last of Dukes Ostrogski-Zasławski.
 Władysław Dominik Zasławski-Ostrogski (c.1616-1656), Voivode of Sandomierz Voivodship.
 Zofia Ostrogska (1595–1662), married Stanisław Lubomirski.
 Anna Alojza Ostrogska (1600–1654), married Jan Karol Chodkiewicz.
 Katarzyna Ostrogska (1602–1642), married Tomasz Zamoyski.
 Teofilia Ludwika Zasławska (1650–1709), married Dymitr Jerzy Wiśniowiecki, then Józef Karol Lubomirski
 Katarzyna Ostrogska (1560–1579), married Krzysztof Mikołaj "the Thunderbolt" Radziwiłł

See also 
 Lithuanian nobility
 List of szlachta

References

External links

 Ostrozki at the Encyclopedia of Ukraine
 Ostrogski Dynasty 
 

 Polish-Lithuanian nobility